The Budapest Festival Orchestra (Hungarian: Budapesti Fesztiválzenekar) was formed in 1983 by Iván Fischer and Zoltán Kocsis, with musicians "drawn from the cream of Hungary's younger players", as The Times put it. Its aim was to make the orchestra's concerts into significant events in Hungary's musical life, and to give Budapest a new symphony orchestra of international standing.

History
Between 1992 and 2000, extending its work to a full season, the ensemble operated under the aegis of the Budapest Municipality and the new BFO Foundation, formed by fifteen Hungarian and multinational corporations and banks. From the 2000/2001 season onwards the orchestra was operated by the BFO Foundation, which the Budapest City Council regularly supports under a contract renewable every five years. In 2003 the Ministry of Cultural Heritage declared the orchestra a national institution supported by the state.

The Festival Orchestra is now part of Budapest's music life and a frequent guest at venues including: Salzburg (Summer Festival), Vienna (Musikverein, Konzerthaus), Lucerne (Festival), Montreux, Zürich (Tonhalle), New York (Carnegie Hall, Avery Fisher Hall), Chicago, Los Angeles (Hollywood Bowl), San Francisco, Montreal, Tokyo (Suntory Hall), Hong Kong, Paris (Théâtre des Champs-Elysées), Berlin, Munich, Frankfurt (Alte Oper), London (BBC Proms Festival, Barbican Centre, Royal Festival Hall), Florence (Maggio Musicale), Rome (Accademia di Santa Cecilia), Amsterdam (Concertgebouw), Madrid, Athens, Copenhagen, Prague (Prague Spring International Music Festival), Brussels (Flamish Festival) and Buenos Aires (Teatro Colón).

After having recorded on Hungaroton, Quintana, Teldec, Decca Records, Ponty and Berlin Classics,  the orchestra signed an exclusive recording contract with Philips Classics in 1996. Its recording of Bartók's The Miraculous Mandarin received the Gramophone Award, while Diapason d'Or and Le Monde de la musique chose it as their recording of the year. Recordings of Liszt's Faust Symphony and Bartók's Concerto for Orchestra were chosen among the year's five best orchestral discs by Gramophone. In 2003 the BFO signed a cooperation agreement with Channel Classics Records.

Musicians who have performed with the orchestra include: Sir Georg Solti (who was the orchestra's honorary guest conductor until his death), Yehudi Menuhin, Kurt Sanderling, Eliahu Inbal, Charles Dutoit, Gidon Kremer, Sándor Végh, András Schiff, Heinz Holliger, Agnes Baltsa, Ida Haendel, Martha Argerich, Hildegard Behrens, Yuri Bashmet, Rudolf Barshai, Kiri te Kanawa, Radu Lupu, Thomas Zehetmair, Vadim Repin, Helen Donath, Richard Goode.

Among the orchestra's more important projects, its opera productions have been widely acclaimed: The Magic Flute (Budapest), Così fan tutte (Athens), Idomeneo (Budapest/Athens), Orfeo ed Euridice (Budapest/Brussels), Il turco in Italia (Paris), the cycle of works marking the 50th anniversary of Bartók's death (Budapest/Brussels/Cologne/Paris/New York), the cycle of Mahler symphonies over several years (Budapest/Lisbon/Frankfurt/Vienna), the series of performances for the centenary of Brahms' death, a Bartók-Stravinsky cycle (Edinburgh/London/San Francisco/New York) and a Liszt-Wagner cycle in January 2004 (Budapest/Bruselles/London). In 2005 the orchestra launched its annual Budapest Mahlerfest.

The orchestra has performed many world and Hungarian premieres (Ustvolskaia, Eötvös, Kurtág, Schönberg, Holliger, Tihanyi, Doráti, Copland, Adams). The orchestra regularly commissions new works (Jeney, Sáry, Lendvay, Vajda, Mártha, Melis, Vidovszky, Tihanyi, Orbán, Láng, Gyöngyösi).

The orchestra has developed regular chamber music and chamber orchestra series alongside its major orchestral concerts. The Sunday afternoon chamber music events, the "Cocoa Concerts" for young children, the Haydn-Mozart series, where soloists of the concertos are members of the orchestra and the "Open Dress Rehearsals" with Iván Fischer's introductions to the works being performed have all quickly become favourites of the Budapest music audience.

In November 2008, the Gramophone magazine selected the BFO into the world's 20 best orchestras as No. 9. In 2022, BFO won Gramophone's Orchestra of the Year Award.

Ever since its foundation, the BFO's Music Director has been Iván Fischer.

References

External links
Official website

Hungarian orchestras
Musical groups established in 1983